Rashid Seidu (born 14 September 1995) is a Ghanaian professional footballer who plays as a goalkeeper. In 2015, he earned a national call-up and was a member of the Ghana U23 for the 2015 All-Africa Games.

Club career 
Seidu signed for professional club Asante Kotoko on 3 January 2011. He joined Nigerien club AS Douanes (Niger) where he secured a year contract with an option of renewal at the end of the season but had a short stint.

He made the move to Bechem United in July 2013, signing a two-year with the Ghanaian Premier League club.

In 2015, Seidu joined Ghanaian Premier league club Wa All Stars now Legon Cities on a four-year deal.

In May 2020, he joined Inter Allies.

International career
In January 2015 he was invited to join the U23 national team for the qualifier games for the All-Africa Games.

Honours

Club
Asante Kotoko
 Ghana Premier League: 2011–2012

Bechem United
 Ghana Super Cup Runner-up: 2011-2012

Wa All Stars
 Ghana Premier League: 2016
 Ghana Super Cup: 2017

References

External links
 

1995 births
Living people
Association football goalkeepers
Ghanaian footballers
Asante Kotoko S.C. players
Legon Cities FC players
Ghana Premier League players
Bechem United FC players
AS Douanes (Niger) players
International Allies F.C. players
Karela United FC players
Ghanaian expatriate footballers
Ghanaian expatriate sportspeople in Niger
Expatriate footballers in Niger
Footballers from Accra
Competitors at the 2015 African Games